Satyavan Savithri is a 1977 Indian Malayalam-language period drama film directed by P. G. Viswambaran, starring Kamal Haasan and Sridevi. The film was also dubbed into Tamil with the same title and into Telugu as Sathyavanthudu.

Synopsis 

Satyavan Savithri is the story of the legendary Savitri, a woman whose devotion matched Draupadi's as said by Markandeya to Yudhishthira's query. The plot has been taken from the epic Mahabharata.

Cast 
 Kamal Haasan as Satyavan
 Sridevi as Savitri
 Adoor Bhasi
 Thikkurissy Sukumaran Nair
 Jose Prakash as Ashwapathi
 Kaviyoor Ponnamma as Arundathi Devi
 Sankaradi as Rajaguru
 Sreelatha Namboothiri
 Pattom Sadan
 P. K. Abraham
 Manavalan Joseph
 T. P. Madhavan
 Kaduvakkulam Antony
 Aranmula Ponnamma
 Baby Sumathi

Songs 

The music was composed by G. Devarajan. Lyrics were written by Sreekumaran Thampi.

Release 

References

External links 
 

1977 films
1970s Malayalam-language films
Films about Savitri and Satyavan
Films directed by P. G. Viswambharan